Sakoanala madagascariensis is a species of legume in the family Fabaceae. It is found only in Madagascar.

References

Faboideae
Endemic flora of Madagascar
Endangered plants
Taxonomy articles created by Polbot